Robert Allen Botz (born April 28, 1935) is a former Major League Baseball relief pitcher.  The ,  right-hander was signed by the Milwaukee Braves as an amateur free agent before the 1955 season.  He was acquired by the Los Angeles Angels from Milwaukee on May 3, 1962, and played for the Angels the rest of that season.

Career
Botz made his major league debut on May 8, 1962, against the Detroit Tigers at Dodger Stadium.  He pitched three scoreless innings in the 10–1 Angels loss.  He struck out two batters, Bill Bruton and Al Kaline.  He earned his first big league save on June 20 in a road game against the Kansas City Athletics, and got his first win exactly one month later in a home game vs. the Cleveland Indians.

Season and career totals include 35 games pitched, all in relief, a 2–1 record, 13 games finished, and 2 saves.  In 63 innings pitched he allowed 71 hits and only 11 walks for a WHIP of 1.302.  He struck out 24 and had an earned run average of 3.43.

In April 1963 Botz was traded to the St. Louis Cardinals for relief pitcher Bob Duliba, and never again pitched in a major league game.

References

External links

1935 births
Living people
Atlanta Crackers players
Baseball players from Milwaukee
Boise Braves players
Cedar Rapids Braves players
Eau Claire Braves players
Evansville Braves players
Indianapolis Indians players
Jacksonville Braves players
Los Angeles Angels players
Louisville Colonels (minor league) players
Major League Baseball pitchers
Topeka Hawks players